Songül Mutluer (born 11 December 1979) is a Dutch politician, serving as a member of the House of Representatives since 2022. She is a member of the Labour Party (PvdA) and has served as a Zaanstad municipal council member and alderwoman for fifteen years before. Having studied law, Mutluer has also worked as a legal professional and taught law at the Vrije Universiteit Amsterdam.

Early life and non-political career 
She was born in 1979 in the Overijssel city Enschede, where her parents, Turkish migrant workers, were employed in the textile industry. She has a brother and five sisters. At age three, Mutluer moved with her mother to Turkey, where she resided in the cities Mersin and Adana. Mutluer returned to the Netherlands in 1988 with her mother. There, she lived in the Zaandam neighborhood Poelenburg and attended the high school Zaanlands Lyceum at gymnasium level in the years 1992–98.

Mutluer subsequently studied law at the University of Amsterdam, obtaining a Master of Laws degree. During her study, when she was just over twenty years old, she returned to Turkey to intern at an Ankara law firm for four months. After graduating in 2004, Mutluer started teaching law at the Vrije Universiteit Amsterdam and received a grant to research invitations to tender. From 2015 to 2017, she served as a guest lecturer at University College Utrecht. Next to her teaching career, she became a legal professional specialized in invitations to tender and contracts, working for Corvers Procurement Services (2016–17) and for the governmental organization Rijkswaterstaat (2017–18).

Politics 
Mutluer became a member of the municipal council of Zaanstad after she was elected in the 2006 election as the Labour Party's fifth candidate in the municipality. Mutluer was re-elected in March 2010, being placed second on the party list. She became her party's caucus leader in the municipal council in December 2010. She again appeared second on the Labour Party's list in the 2014 municipal election. Besides, Mutluer became a member of an advisory committee that selected the Labour Party's candidates for the 2017 general election. She stepped down as caucus leader for a half year starting in the spring of 2016 in order to write her dissertation.

Mutluer was re-elected once again in March 2018 as her party's . She vacated her seat in the municipal council in June to serve as alderwoman of housing, youth care services, poverty, and elderly policy in the new municipal executive. She also became a board member of the Association of Netherlands Municipalities (VNG) in late 2019. Zaanstad received €20.5 million from the national government during her term to invest in the quick construction of new houses and another €43 million to spend on vulnerable neighborhoods in the eastern part of the city, more than any other municipality. Mutluer told that she wanted to use the latter funds to increase the sustainability of 850 houses, to improve public spaces and amenities, and to combat housing fraud. Halfway through 2020, a number of youth care service centers stopped admitting new children, as the region Zaanstreek-Waterland had run out of its budget for that year. The regional audit office concluded that the costs Zaanstad was making had gotten out of hand in the preceding years and that the municipality did not have reliable data about its system. Mutluer called on the national government to provide more funds to municipalities for youth care services.

She was the Labour Party's tenth candidate in the March 2021 general election and received 4,896 preference votes. Mutluer was not elected, as her party won nine seats in the House of Representatives. She had previously been one of the  during the 2012 general election in the Den Helder electoral district (place 77). Mutluer was eventually appointed to the House of Representatives on 17 February 2022 following the resignation of Gijs van Dijk due to inappropriate behavior, and she simultaneously stepped down as alderwoman and board member of the VNG. She became her party's spokesperson for security, justice, and neighborhoods. A motion by Mutluer was carried stating that also insured inhabitants of Limburg and North Brabant with damage from the 2021 European floods should receive compensation from the government. A number of victims had received payments from their insurance company insufficient to repair all the damage and had because of that not qualified for government compensation.

In March 2022, Mutluer was the Labour Party's  in Zaanstad in the municipal election. She had also been pursuing a second term as alderwoman before her appointment to the House.

Personal life 
Mutluer is a resident of the North Holland city of Zaandam.

References 

1979 births
21st-century Dutch politicians
21st-century Dutch women politicians
Aldermen in North Holland
Dutch people of Turkish descent
Labour Party (Netherlands) politicians
Living people
Members of the House of Representatives (Netherlands)
Municipal councillors in North Holland
People from Zaanstad
University of Amsterdam alumni
Academic staff of Vrije Universiteit Amsterdam